1 Tanner Row is a historic building in the city centre of York, in England.

The building was originally constructed in the late 15th century, as a wealden hall house, which by the date was a common design in South East England, but rare in York.  1 Tanner Row and the Wealden Hall, also in the city, are the two northernmost surviving examples of wealden halls.  As built, it had a large open hall, with a two-storey block on the east, and another to the west which could not be accessed from the hall.

In the 17th century, the hall and the east block were divided to form two tenements.  As part of the conversion, a floor was added to divide the hall vertically, and it was extended to jetty out, matching the east and west blocks.  A central chimney and two staircases were also added.  The building was refronted in the 18th century.  In the late 19th century, the west block became vacant, and it was demolished in 1929.  Around this time, the roof of the remaining part of the building was replaced.  Although it became vacant in the mid-20th century, it was restored in the early 1970s, and again in 1991, to serve as offices.  In 1971, it was Grade II* listed.

The building is timber framed and is now all two stories high.  It lies on the corner of Tanner Row and North Street, and there is a decorated beam at the corner.  The original doorway, now altered, is in the middle of the North Street facade, and to its right are a 19th-century door and large window.  To the south, the building now adjoins another house, and the dividing wall has been rebuilt in brick.  Inside, much of the timber framing survives, as does one 17th-century staircase.

References

Tanner Row 1
Grade II* listed houses
Houses completed in the 15th century
Houses in North Yorkshire
Timber framed buildings in Yorkshire